Hus Gallery is a contemporary art gallery that was founded in 2010, with locations in both central London and Copenhagen, Denmark.

Exhibitions
 Johan Van Mullem, 'Origin', Solo Exhibition.
 Purdey Fitzherbert, 'Afterimage', Solo Exhibition.
 Howard Tangye, 'Casting the Line', Solo Exhibition.
 The Back of Beyond, Adam Bainbridge, Sam Irons & Neil Raitt.
 Floating Perspectives, Seung Ah Paik, Solo Exhibition.
 Space Age, Ophelia Finke, Konrad Wyrebek, Santiago Taccetti & Nathan Green.
 Massimo Agostinelli, Palindromes Series, 2014 Solo Exhibition.
 Human Interface, Ben Noam, Garrett Pruter, Yarisal & Kublitz, Johnny Abrahams, Nick Van Woert, and Grear Patterson.
 Neil Raitt, Cabinectomy, Solo Exhibition, The Goss-Michael Foundation.
 Gregor Gleiwitz, Predator, Solo Exhibition.
 Virgile Ittah & Kai Yoda, Walking on the beach imitating sand.
 ISO 9001, Santiago Taccetti.

References

External links
 Hus Gallery official website

Contemporary art galleries in London
Art museums and galleries in Copenhagen
Contemporary art galleries in Denmark
Buildings and structures in Mayfair
Art galleries established in 2010
2010 establishments in England
British companies established in 2010